La Désirade Passage is a strait in the Caribbean. It separates the island of la Désirade, from Grande-Terre (Guadeloupe).

History 
The waters of the La Désirade Passage have long been known to be very dangerous and the crossings were historically perilous, at least until the arrival of new ferry vessels.

But there is also, and perhaps above all, a historical reason related to the fact that in the eighteenth century, the island La Désirade was endowed with a leprosarium. In addition, the island was also used as a land of exile for the undesirables of the king's court.

References

Geography of la Désirade
Straits of Guadeloupe